This is a list of notable sex therapists.

Laura Berman
Yitzchak Binik
Lori Brotto
Ray Blanchard
James Cantor
Jack Drescher
Stefani Goerlich
Magnus Hirschfeld
Sue Johanson
Virginia E. Johnson
Martin P. Kafka
Helen Singer Kaplan
Peggy J. Kleinplatz
Heba Kotb
Richard von Krafft-Ebing
Sandra Leiblum
William Masters
Heino Meyer-Bahlburg
John Money
Esther Perel
Michael Perelman
Robert Taylor Segraves
Ruth Westheimer (Dr. Ruth)
Kenneth J. Zucker

Sex therapy
 
sex therapists